Tomas Serra Olives (born 9 April 1944) is a Spanish chess FIDE Master (FM) (2006), three-times Spanish Senior Chess Championships winner (2009, 2010, 2012).

Biography
In the beginning of 1960s Serra was one of Spain's leading chess players.

Serra played for Spain in the Chess Olympiad:
 In 1962, at second reserve board in the 15th Chess Olympiad in Varna (+5, =4, -1).

Serra played for Spain in the European Team Chess Championship preliminaries:
 In 1961, at seventh board in the 2nd European Team Chess Championship preliminaries (+0, =1, -1),

Serra successfully participated in the seniors chess championships. He three times won the Spanish Senior Chess Championship: 2009, 2010, and 2012.

References

External links
 
 
 Tomas Serra Olives chess games at 365chess.com

1944 births
Living people
Spanish chess players
Chess Olympiad competitors